Prem Kumar Gangai Amaren (born 26 February 1979), better known as  Premgi, is an Indian playback singer, composer, songwriter, actor and comedian. The son of composer and director Gangai Amaran, he often composes rap songs in Tamil cinema and is known for his comical performances in his elder brother Venkat Prabhu's films. His stage name, Premgi, is actually a spelling error, as it is meant to be "Prem G.", (the G referring to his father's name). He is also best known for his catchphrases Enna Koduma Sir Idhu ? (What atrocity is this, sir ?) and Evvalavo pannitom, itha panna mattoma (We've done so much, won't we do this also ?), the former being a modified version of a famous dialogue used by Prabhu in Chandramukhi (2005).

Career
In 1997, Premgi planned to enter the film industry as a director with a project titled Wanted starring Venkat Prabhu and S. P. B. Charan. The film, which had Yuvan Shankar Raja as music composer and Gangai Amaren and S. P. Balasubrahmanyam as comedians, did not complete shoot.

Primarily interested in composing music, Premgi then started his career as an assistant to film music composer and his cousin Yuvan Shankar Raja, turning a playback singer, singing mostly the rap portions in Yuvan Shankar Raja's compositions, before working with other music composers as well. Working with Yuvan Shankar Raja, he also remixed some of his compositions for the soundtrack albums, the first being "Loosu Penne" from the film Vallavan.

In 2006, however, he made his acting debut in Silambarasan's Vallavan as the heroine's friend, following which he starred in his brother Venkat Prabhu's directorial debut Chennai 600028 (2007), in which he played Seenu. The movie went on to become the year's biggest summer blockbuster, establishing Premgi as a comedy actor. He joined with his brother for his next film Saroja, which fetched him accolades for his performance as Ganesh Kumar.

He appeared as a lead character in Venkat Prabhu's Goa (2010), before going on to make further appearances in Mankatha (2011) and Settai (2013). In 2013, he made his Malayalam debut in North 24 Kaatham. In the upcoming Maanga, he plays the lead character and also works as the music composer. He currently acts in Chennai 600028 II: Second Innings, which is a sequel of the super-hit movie Chennai 600028.

Composing
In 2005, he became an independent music director with Gnabagam Varuthe, starring his brother. After that, he composed for Agathiyan's Nenjathai Killathe and for Thozha, in which he played one of the leading roles as well. Apart from film music, he composed music for an episode titled Planet Galatta II – Adra Sakkae on Singapore's satellite channel, "Mediacorp Vasantham".

Amaren composed a song with singer Suresh Peters  called "The One Anthem", and it was made as a tribute to the legend Michael Jackson.

Family
Premgi is the son of veteran director and musician Gangai Amaran, and the younger brother of film director and actor Venkat Prabhu. Film composer Ilaiyaraaja is his uncle, while Yuvan Shankar Raja, Karthik Raja and Bhavatharini are his cousins.

Filmography

As actor
Films

Web series

As music director

Discography

Awards
International Tamil Film Awards
 Best Supporting Actor – Mankatha

References

External links
 
 
 

1979 births
Living people
Indian male film actors
Indian male playback singers
Telugu playback singers
Tamil playback singers
Tamil male actors
Tamil rappers
International Tamil Film Award winners
Tamil comedians
Tamil film score composers
Indian male film score composers
Indian male comedians
Male actors in Tamil cinema